The Hermitage of Virgen del Puerto (Spanish: Ermita de la Virgen del Puerto) is a hermitage located in Madrid, Spain. It was declared Bien de Interés Cultural in 1946.

References 

Christian hermitages in Spain
Buildings and structures in Palacio neighborhood, Madrid
Bien de Interés Cultural landmarks in Madrid